The Indid race is an obsolete term for the physical type most common among populations native to the Indian subcontinent. The Indid type was classified as belonging to the greater Caucasoid race in 19th and 20th century anthropological literature.

Physiognomy 
American anthropologist Carleton S. Coon described the Indid race as occupying the Indian subcontinent, beginning from the Khyber Pass. Coon wrote that "India is the easternmost outpost of the Caucasian racial region." Indologists, such as those in the All-India Oriental Conference, described in 1941 the Indid type to constitute a standard set of features:

The Royal Society of Letters at Lund likewise stated in 1946 that the Indid type possessed a narrow forehead and large eye sockets. John Montgomery Cooper, an American ethnologist and Roman Catholic priest, on 26 April 1945 in a hearing before the United States Senate "To Permit all people from India residing in the United States to be Naturalized" recorded:

German physical anthropologist Egon Freiherr von Eickstedt (1892–1965) made two subdivisions of the Indid race: (1) the North Indid type, which he stated was typified by people such as the Todas of the Nilgiri Mountains and Rajputs from Rajasthan; and (2) the Gracile Indid type, which he stated was represented by people such as the Bengalis. The Romani people, being among the oldest members of the Indian diaspora, were classified as being of the Indid type.

The theory propounded by German comparative philologists in the 1840s and 1850s "maintained that the speakers of Indo-European languages in India, Persia, and Europe were of the same culture and race." This led to a distinction between the majority Indo-Aryan peoples of northern India and the less populous speakers of Dravidian languages, located mostly in southern India with pockets in the Baluchistan Province in the northwest and in the eastern corner of the Bihar Province. Notwithstanding, Dravidians came to be classified as belonging to the Caucasian race by 19th and 20th-century anthropologists.
 
In 1929, the editor of Vreme in discussing the Miss Yugoslavia Competition wrote that the Yugoslavs were a heterogeneous group, "defined by blond hair and blue eyes, with admixtures of northern Asian and Indid races, Slav tribes, and old Balkan races such as the Thracians."

See also 
Historical definitions of races in India
Aryavarta
Iranid race

References 

Historical definitions of race